The Sobger River is a river in northern New Guinea, province of Papua, Indonesia. It is a tributary of the Taritatu River, The total length is 188.861 km.
which it forms by merging with the Nawa River.

Geography
The river flows in the northern area of Papua with predominantly tropical rainforest climate (designated as Af in the Köppen-Geiger climate classification). The annual average temperature in the area is 21 °C. The warmest month is April, when the average temperature is around 22 °C, and the coldest is January, at 20 °C. The average annual rainfall is 4839 mm. The wettest month is January, with an average of 579 mm rainfall, and the driest is July, with 205 mm rainfall.

See also
List of rivers of Indonesia
List of rivers of Western New Guinea

References

Rivers of Papua (province)
Rivers of Indonesia